Vijay Prakash (born 21 February 1976) is an Indian Playback singer and also a Music Composer from Karnataka. He has given his voice for predominantly Kannada and Telugu language films. In addition, he has also sung in Hindi, Tamil, Malayalam and Marathi. He is one of the singers in the Oscar winning song 'Jai Ho' composed by the legendary Music Director A.R. Rahman. He is one of the judges for the Kannada reality show Sa Re Ga Ma Pa on Zee Kannada. He has also performed shows with Zakir Hussain. Prakash won the Karnataka Government's 'Best Playback Singer' award for the year 2016 for the song "Nammooralli Chaligaladalli" from the film Beautiful Manasugalu.

He is also one of four artists credited for the song "Jai Ho", which won the 2008 Academy Award for Best Original Song. Specifically, he sang the portion with the words "Jai Ho" that takes an extended high pitch at numerous junctures of the song. The song also won a Grammy Award in the category "Best Song Written For Motion Picture, Television Or Other Visual Media." He has also won the Filmfare Award for Best Male Playback Artist – Kannada twice for the songs Gatiya Ilidu from the Kannada film Ulidavaru Kandante and Belageddu  from Kirik Party.

Early life
He was born in Mysore, India to Carnatic Artists Lopamudra and Late L. Ramasesha, and is himself trained in Carnatic music. He was trained carnatic classic music by Bellary.M.Raghavendra

Career
After moving to Mumbai in 1996, he became a student of Suresh Wadkar. Prakash was a participant in the program Sa Re Ga Ma on Zee TV, hosted by Sonu Nigam. He made it to the mega-finals in 1999. Later he compered Sa Re Ga Ma Pa on Zee Kannada. He got his first break in Hindi cinema with the film Baaz in 2002, and his first song for A. R. Rahman was in Ashutosh Gowariker's Swades, followed by the same composer's Tamil title track for the movie New. His song "Kavite" in Kannada movie Gaalipata too became famous.

He has done backing vocals for about 25 foreign films, including the film Couples Retreat, with music by A. R. Rahmaan. He has recorded for ads like "Kabhi chatpataa" for Knorr Soups and "Na sar jhuka hain kabhi" for HDFC Life Insurance. In 2008 he sang the "Condom a capella" ringtone composed by Rupert Fernandes and produced by the BBC World Service Trust for an Indian safe sex campaign. In 2009, his song, "Jai Ho"(Only chorus, original song sung by Sukhwinder Singh), won the 2008 Academy Award for Best Original Song.

He was one of the Judges in Confident Star Singer 2 (Kannada), which aired on Asianet Suvarna in 2009.

He has sung "Om Sivoham", a Sanskrit song penned by Vaali and composed by Ilaiyaraaja which was the main theme song of 2009 Tamil film Naan Kadavul.

In 2010, he became a regular artist under composer A. R. Rahman, as he performed several of his numbers such as "Hosanna" (Vinnaithaandi Varuvaaya, Ye Maaya Chesave), "Beera Beera, Veera Veera (in Tamil & Telugu Versions)" (Raavan & Raavanan), "Powerstar" (Komaram Puli) and "Kadhal Anukkal" (Enthiran).

Prakash has debuted as a music composer for the 2013 Kannada film Andar Bahar starring Shivrajkumar.

He also won the Vijay Music Awards for the Best Male Playback for the song "Hosanna" from Vinnaithaandi Varuvaayaa.

In 2013, he appeared as one of the artists in Coke Studio @ MTV.

In 2013, his song 'Khaali , written by lyricist Yograj Bhat, went viral on social media. The song 'Hoge' that he has sung for the film 'Nam Life Story' in Kannada is also going viral.

In 2018, the song 'Bombe Helutaite' from the film  Raajakumara   inspired by the song 'Aadisi nodu bilisi nodu' from the film  Kasturi Nivasa  became one of the industry evergreen songs. It was written by  Santhosh Ananddram . 
In 2021, the duo created another magical 
song dedicated to the student-teacher relationship named 'Paatashala' in the film  Yuvarathnaa .

Prakash was also the brand ambassador of Nissan Evalia 'moves like music' campaign, which featured six young prominent artists of India.

He is one of the very few Indian musicians who have had the honour of performing at the Berklee College of Music in Boston, USA.

Discography

As a composer

As a playback singer

Kannada

Tamil films

Telugu films

Other films

Awards and Titles

References

External links

Notes
BBC World Service Trust –  India – Condom condom – video  at BBC

Singers from Karnataka
Indian male playback singers
Bollywood playback singers
Telugu playback singers
Indian television presenters
Kannada film score composers
Kannada people
Living people
Musicians from Mysore
Film musicians from Karnataka
Male actors in Kannada television
Indian male television actors
21st-century Indian male actors
21st-century Indian singers
Filmfare Awards South winners
Male film score composers
21st-century Indian male singers
1976 births